Akvilė is a Lithuanian feminine given name. People bearing the name Akvilė include:
Akvilė Paražinskaitė (born 1996), Lithuanian tennis player
Akvilė Stapušaitytė (born 1986), Lithuanian badminton player

References

Lithuanian feminine given names